Orrin N. Carter (January 22, 1854 – August 16, 1928) was an American jurist.

Biography
Born in Jefferson County, New York, Carter moved with his parents to DuPage County, Illinois where he lived on a farm. Carter received his bachelor's degree from Wheaton College in 1877. Carter studied law and was admitted to the Illinois bar. He taught school in Grundy County, Illinois and served as state's attorney for Grundy County. In 1888, he moved to Chicago, Illinois and served as attorney for the Chicago Sanitary District from 1892 to 1894. In 1894, Carter was elected circuit court judge for Cook County, Illinois. In 1900, Carter was a candidate for the Republican nomination for Governor of Illinois. From 1906 until 1924, Carter served on the Illinois Supreme Court. He retired in 1924 because of ill health and died at his home in Glendale, California.

He was the brother of businessman and politician Zina R. Carter.

References

1854 births
1928 deaths
People from Glendale, California
Politicians from Chicago
People from Grundy County, Illinois
People from Jefferson County, New York
Wheaton College (Illinois) alumni
Illinois Republicans
Illinois state court judges
Justices of the Illinois Supreme Court
Chief Justices of the Illinois Supreme Court
Judges of the Circuit Court of Cook County